Amravati Lok Sabha constituency is one of the 48 Lok Sabha (parliamentary) constituencies in Maharashtra state in western India.

Assembly segments
Presently, Amravati Lok Sabha constituency comprises six Vidhan Sabha (legislative assembly) segments. These segments (with constituency number and reservation status) are:

Members of Parliament

^ by-poll

Election results

General elections 2019

General elections 2014

General elections 2009

See also
 Amravati district
 Wardha district
 Ramtek Lok Sabha constituency (for Amravati West Lok Sabha constituency abolished after 1951 elections)
 List of Constituencies of the Lok Sabha

Notes

References

External links
Amravati lok sabha  constituency election 2019 results details

Lok Sabha constituencies in Maharashtra
Amravati district